Rudolf Ulrich (3 January 1922 – 4 April 1997) was a German film actor. He appeared in 67 films between 1954 and 1986. He died in Berlin at age 75.

Selected filmography
 Duped Till Doomsday (1957)
 Polonia-Express (1957)
 Brücke zwischen gestern und morgen (1959)
Viel Lärm Um Nichts (1964)
 The Rabbit Is Me (1965)
 Tecumseh (1972)
 Otpisani (1974)
 Between Day and Night (1975)

References

External links

1922 births
1997 deaths
German male film actors
20th-century German male actors